John Francis Dearden (October 15, 1907 – August 1, 1988) was an American prelate of the Roman Catholic Church. He served as Archbishop of Detroit from 1958 to 1980, and was created a cardinal in 1969. He previously served as Bishop of Pittsburgh from 1950 to 1958. During his tenure in Pittsburgh, Dearden earned the nickname "Iron John" for his stern manner of administration.

In Detroit, Dearden was active in community causes, supporting equal employment opportunities and better racial relations in the city. He played an influential role at the Second Vatican Council. Dearden served as the first president of the National Conference of Catholic Bishops.

Early life and education
John Dearden was born in Valley Falls, Rhode Island, the eldest of five children of John Sidney and Agnes (née Gregory) Dearden. He received his early education at the parochial school of Holy Trinity Church in Central Falls. At age 11, Dearden and his family moved to Cleveland, Ohio. He continued his education at St. Philomena School in East Cleveland, and then attended Cathedral Latin High School from 1921 to 1925.

In 1925, Dearden began his studies for the priesthood at St. Mary's Seminary in Cleveland. He graduated from St. Mary's in 1929, and was then sent to continue his studies in Rome at the Pontifical North American College and the Pontifical Gregorian University.

Priesthood
On December 8, 1932, Dearden was ordained a priest by Cardinal Francesco Marchetti Selvaggiani in Rome. He earned a doctorate in theology from the Gregorian in 1934. Following his return to Ohio, he was assigned as a curate at St. Mary's Church in Painesville, where he remained for three years. He then served as professor of philosophy (1937–48) and rector (1944–48) at St. Mary's Seminary. He was raised to the rank of papal chamberlain on July 19, 1945.

Episcopate

Pittsburgh
On March 13, 1948, Dearden was appointed coadjutor bishop of the Diocese of Pittsburgh in Pennsylvania and titular bishop of Sarepta by Pope Pius XII. He received his episcopal consecration on the following May 18 from Archbishop Amleto Giovanni Cicognani, with Bishops Edward Francis Hoban and Floyd Lawrence Begin serving as co-consecrators, at St. Agnes Church in Cleveland. Upon the death of Bishop Hugh Charles Boyle, Dearden succeeded him as the seventh Bishop of Pittsburgh on December 22, 1950.

During his tenure in Pittsburgh, Dearden earned the nickname "Iron John" for his stern manner of administration. In 1952, he issued new regulations for interfaith marriages, allowing marriages between Catholics and non-Catholics to take place in a church, but insisted his actions "must not be understood as mitigating in any degree the general rule of the church that is opposed in principle to such unions." He was named an Assistant at the Pontifical Throne in 1957.

Detroit
Following the death of Cardinal Edward Mooney, Dearden was appointed the second Archbishop of Detroit on December 18, 1958. He was active in community causes such as supporting equal employment opportunities and encouraging his diocese to work for better racial relations in Detroit. His commitment to racial justice frequently put him at odds with priests and lay Catholics at the parish level who organized to fight neighborhood integration. Dearden in 1967 concluded that "the Negro-white confrontation in American cities is in great part a Negro-Catholic confrontation."

Vatican II
Dearden attended all four sessions of the Second Vatican Council between 1962 and 1965. He played an influential role at the Council, helping develop key documents like Lumen gentium and Gaudium et spes. During the Council, he became more progressive in his views, becoming known as a "favorite of the liberals in the church." He dedicated himself to implementing the reforms of the Council, promoting the greater participation of the laity in diocesan affairs, encouraging the formation of a priests' senate, and ordaining married deacons. When Pope Paul VI agreed with the idea raised by participants in Vatican II and restored the permanent diaconate in 1967, Dearden was the first in America to utilize the pronouncement and augmented the declining numbers of regular clergy in his diocese by ordaining thirteen married laymen as deacons in 1971.

Dearden drew the attention of the national media for "his innovative approach to the new liturgy and teachings." He was characterized as a "progressive" and a "liberal" and was even condemned by The Wanderer as "a major heretic, one of the worst the Catholic Church has ever suffered from." The New York Times speculated that in 1979 when Pope John Paul II came to America, answering an invitation to speak at the United Nations, he "snubbed" Dearden by not scheduling a visit to Detroit "in favor of John Cardinal Cody of Chicago, whose conservatism the Pope found more to his liking." Despite his liberal outlook, Dearden had "too many theological objections" to support the ordination of women.

Project Equality
In 1965, Dearden partnered with Cardinal Joseph Ritter to inaugurate Project Equality, an interfaith program requiring businesses to pledge to a policy of non-discrimination in hiring and discharging employees. He also announced that the archdiocese would give preferential treatment to suppliers who gave equal opportunity to minority groups. As a member of the National Catholic Welfare Council, he served as its treasurer, a member of its administrative board, and chairman of its Committee on the Liturgical Apostolate.

School closings
When Michigan voters amended the state constitution to bar all taxpayer aid to private schools in 1970, Dearden ordered all parishes in his diocese to examine their finances and determine if their schools were a financial drain due to declining enrollment. Examining this data, he ordered the closing of 56 of the 269 schools in 1971. This raised an outcry from affected parishioners who were especially vexed as he was head of the bishops' conference at the time.

NCCB/USCC President
From 1966 to 1971, Dearden served as the first president of the National Conference of Catholic Bishops. Dearden was instrumental in forming the National Conference of Catholic Bishops (NCCB) and its public-policy arm, the United States Catholic Conference (USCC). Dearden worked with a group that had come to fame by redesigning the management of the auto industry – the Booz Allen Hamilton management-consultant firm. Together they worked to design NCCB's structures and procedures. The ethos that resulted  gave the "bureaucracy significant power and influence in U.S. Catholic affairs. As the conference’s voice increased, that of individual bishops tended to decrease."

As the head of the NCCB Dearden was known as "the unobtrusive liberal" for his emphasis on governing through consensus. During his tenure, the conference approved several liturgical reforms, including using English for the eucharistic prayer, authorizing extraordinary ministers of Communion, and holding Saturday evening Masses. Following the death of Cardinal Francis Spellman, Dearden was considered a likely candidate to become Archbishop of New York. In 1971, Dearden was succeeded as president of the NCCB/USCC by John Krol of Philadelphia, who was seen as a leading conservative.

Call to Action

After Vatican II, Dearden had been working for a National Pastoral Council to bring bishops, priests, religious, and lay people together to examine their "shared responsibility" on civic issues in the life of the Church. He had made several exploratory steps towards this as president of the NCCB/USCCB but this had all been frustrated by a 1973 letter to the bishops from the Vatican expressing concern over events in the Church within America and the Netherlands that ordered plans for national councils to be placed on hold.

With the ban in place, a similar smaller event began to be planned which is referred to as the Call to Action conference. Just a few years before the anniversary of American independence, Dearden had been made the head of a committee for the NCCB to prepare a Catholic response to the 1976 Bicentennial of the United States. The centerpiece of the response was the Liberty and Justice for All project to discuss peace and social justice issues.

In an effort to gather input from the laity for this project, hearings across America were held designated "Call to Action". Dearden stated this was to find out "how the American Catholic community can contribute to the quest of all people for liberty and justice." Such hearings were held in Atlanta, Minneapolis, Newark, Sacramento, San Antonio, and Washington, D.C. These proceeded by having a select group of 500 persons address panels which included a number of bishops. Regional, diocesan, and parish groups were also given the option to have meetings on the subject and they produced 800,000 responses.

The response from the hearings and the meetings were reviewed by eight preparatory committees which produced working papers and recommendations to be presented at the Call to Action conference held in the Detroit convention center with 1,340 delegates in attendance, 152 of which were appointed by bishops of the 167 American dioceses. Each of 92 national Catholic organizations were allowed to send a single delegate to represent them. Almost a third of all delegates were clergy (mostly priests with 110 bishops) and another third were women. Half of all the delegates were church employees. The delegates broke into small groups using the working papers as a basis of discussion but free to make their own recommendations to the NCCB/USCC.

In the end, 29 recommendations were made and divided into 218 separate items. Many of the suggestions were viewed as radical:  

"Among them were recommendations for returning laicized priests to the ministry, the ordination of married men and of women, lay preachers, freedom to practice contraception, an open attitude toward homosexuality, and reception of communion by divorced and remarried Catholics. The recommendations of a social and political nature included ones supporting amnesty for Vietnam war resisters and for undocumented immigrants...[and] a recommendation backing the proposed Equal Rights Amendment to the Constitution". 

The NCCB/USCC received the recommendations with thanks but many bishops were unhappy with the results and they were relegated to a committee to oversee their implementation, which shelved them. The fruitless outcome of the conference ended any efforts of Dearden to work for a full National Pastoral Council. CTA continued as a dissenting Catholic organization and is active as of 2021.

Third Synod of Bishops
In 1971 he was the lead for the American delegation to the third Synod of Bishops (which had been established after Vatican II to give continuing counsel to the papacy). The topics of the synod were social justice and the problem of declining numbers of seminarians and priests.

Office of Cardinal
Pope Paul VI created him Cardinal Priest of S. Pio X alla Balduina in the consistory of April 28, 1969. During the 1971 Synod of Bishops in Vatican City, Dearden suggested that the sociological and psychological aspects of the priesthood be investigated. Following the outbreak of the Watergate scandal in 1973, Dearden issued a pastoral letter in which he remarked, "These are difficult days for the country we love," and asked Catholics to observe the first three Fridays in November as days of prayer, penance and fasting in light of the nation's political turmoil. He suffered a serious heart attack in April 1977.

He was also one of the cardinal electors who participated in the conclaves of August and October 1978, which selected Pope John Paul I and Pope John Paul II, respectively.

Later life
Three years after suffering a heart attack, he resigned as Detroit's archbishop on July 15, 1980, after twenty-one years of service. On August 1, 1988, Dearden died from pancreatic cancer in Southfield, Michigan, at age 80. He was still a member of the Roman Curia's Congregation for the Sacraments at the time. He is buried in Holy Sepulchre Cemetery in Southfield.

References

External links

 Cardinals of the Holy Roman Church
 Roman Catholic Diocese of Pittsburgh Former Diocesan Bishops webpage

1907 births
1988 deaths
Religious leaders from Pittsburgh
20th-century American cardinals
Roman Catholic Diocese of Cleveland
Roman Catholic archbishops of Detroit
Roman Catholic bishops of Pittsburgh
Participants in the Second Vatican Council
Burials in Michigan
Cardinals created by Pope Paul VI
Laetare Medal recipients
Deaths from cancer in Michigan
Deaths from pancreatic cancer
American Roman Catholic clergy of Irish descent
Catholics from Rhode Island
Catholics from Ohio